WJEK (95.3 MHz) is a commercial FM radio station broadcasting a Contemporary Christian radio format, known as "Christian FM 95.3."  Licensed to Rantoul, Illinois, United States, the station serves the Champaign-Urbana metropolitan area.  The station is currently owned by SJ Broadcasting, LLC.

History
The station went on the air as WRTL-FM on 1979-07-30.  on 1984-11-21, the station changed its call sign to WRBZ-FM, on 1988-07-01 to WZNF, on 2000-01-03 to WBNB, on 2002-03-01 to WEVX, on 2006-09-18 to WMYE, on 2007-09-14 to WLFH, and on 2010-11-08 to the current WJEK.

WRTL-FM was originally owned by Bob Brown and Dick Williams. Its musical format was Easy Listening. John Truscelli was eventually the morning drive personality, Mark Williams the morning news personality. Other on-air personalities were Bob Boice, Kevin Scott, Ann Bailey, Dan Jones. WRTL-FM was sold in the early 80's and became WRBZ-FM.

When the station was WZNF, it was a rock/classic rock station owned by Rollings Communications. At its height in the early 1990s, WZNF's signal was simulcasted into three additional markets. Those were WWDZ-FM (94.9 FM, Danville, IL), WZZP-FM (95.1, Kankakee, IL), and WZNX-FM (107.9, Charleston-Mattoon, IL).  During this time, it employed the moniker "Z95" and then later "The Fox".

The WLFH callsign was previously used by an AM station in Little Falls, New York (currently WIXT).

On May 21, 2010 it was announced that RadioStar, Inc. was in the process of selling WLFH to SJ Broadcasting LLC. SJ Broadcasting is operated by Steve "Stevie Jay" Khachaturian and Clint Atkins (until Atkins' death in March 2011).

On November 8, 2010 WLFH changed their call letters to WJEK.

On November 29, 2010 WJEK changed their format to talk, branded as "Connect FM".

WSJK and WJEK broadcast a variety of programs, with owner Stevie Jay (formerly of WDWS) providing his show weekday mornings. Both stations offer Wall Street Journal This Morning, Fox News Radio, as well as ESPN Radio on nights and weekends. Connect FM became the new Champaign home of the St. Louis Cardinals in 2011, replacing WDWS after almost 70 years.

Before the switch, 93.5 was known as 93.5 The Beat, while 95.3 was 95.3 The Wolf.

In April 2012, WSJK/WJEK cancelled its late-morning and midday talk programs and replaced them with ESPN Radio programs. In September 2012, Connect FM was officially rebranded as 93.5/95.3 ESPN. Although the switch is to sports, two talk programs, Wall Street Journal This Morning and the Stevie Jay Show remain from the former Connect FM.

The afternoon-drive sports show, the Tay and J Show, focuses heavily on University of Illinois athletics and is co-hosted by former WAND sportscaster Lon Tay and former News-Gazette and DeKalb Daily Chronicle reporter Jeremy Werner, who also writes for Rivals.com.

On February 18, 2013 WJEK split from its simulcast with WSJK and changed their format to adult contemporary, branded as "Sunny 95.3".

On November 1, 2016 WJEK changed their format from adult contemporary to contemporary Christian, branded as "Christian FM 95.3".

References

External links

JEK
Champaign County, Illinois
Rantoul, Illinois